Catholic College Wodonga is a co-educational Catholic school in Wodonga, Victoria, Australia, catering for students from Years 7 through to 12.

Founded by the Wodonga Catholic Parish in 1979, the College's aim is to find "Life in Jesus" and to continue the work of the Sisters of Mercy in educating young people for a range of pathways in life. Catholic College Wodonga is part of Catholic Education Wodonga (CEW), a division of Catholic Education Sandhurst.

Because of this association students are often streamed from the three Catholic primary schools which make up the rest of CEW. These feeder schools are St. Monicas Primary School, St. Augustines Primary School and St Francis of Assisi Primary School.

History
In 1876  a co-educational primary school was built on the corner of High Street and Osburn Street. In 1892, four teachers from the Sisters of Mercy from Albury began the foundation of a new educational institution in Wodonga, which was completed in 1899 and became St. Augustine's Primary school. The school continued until 1982 under the name St Augustine's. In the meanwhile,  female students from out-lying areas boarded  at the convent.

In the 1970s, Albury-Wodonga was declared a National Growth Centre and by 1979 an increased number of students lead to the St Augustine’s Girls Secondary College being relocated to the Wodonga West location under the new name of "Catholic College Wodonga"

In 2019, the College celebrated its 40th Anniversary.

CEW theme 
Each year the College is given a theme to have the students aim to follow and be alike.  From 2014, Catholic Education Wodonga (CEW) decided to use the theme across all four of the Catholic Schools in Wodonga.

Teaching and learning 
Catholic College is divided into six Learning Communities or Houses; Hollows (yellow), Malone (green), da Vinci (blue), Chisholm (red), Gandhi (orange) and MacKillop (purple). Each with their own given LCL (Learning Community Leader).

Beginning the day, students start the day in their home bases or better known as Learning Mentor Groups (LMs). LMs contain students from a single community and across a variety of years of approximately 28 students. The objective of LMs is to encourage friendships across year levels and announce relevant school news. Each LM is co-ordinated by two, or in some cases three, teachers who is the primary contact for students in their group regarding school or administrative issues. They also provide the students with academical references.

In October 2018, the new Aquinas Centre (Science) was opened for use by students and staff.

Notable alumni
 Fraser Gehrig - AFL footballer
 Ben McEvoy - AFL footballer
 Ben Paton - AFL footballer
 Nathan Clarke - OMFNL Reserves
 Jess Foley - Australian Basketballer, WAFL player
 Jonathon Ceglar- AFL Footballer
 Hamish McIntosh - AFL Footballer
 Rory Hilton - AFL Footballer

References

Educational institutions established in 1979t
Wodonga
Catholic secondary schools in Victoria (Australia)
1979 establishments in Australia